is a junction railway station in the city of Sano, Tochigi, Japan. It is jointly operated by JR East and the private railway operator Tōbu Railway. The station is numbered "TI-34" in the Tobu Railway system.

Lines
Sano Station is served by the JR East Ryōmō Line, and is 26.6 km from the terminus of that line at Oyama Station.

Station layout
Sano Station has two island platforms, connected to the station building by a footbridge.

JR East platforms

Tobu platforms

History
What is now the JR East station first opened on 22 May 1888. The Tōbu station opened on 30 March 1894. The current station building was completed in 2003.

From 17 March 2012, station numbering was introduced on all Tōbu lines, with Sano Station becoming "TI-34".

Passenger statistics
In fiscal 2019, the Tōbu station was used by an average of 3362 passengers daily (boarding passengers only). The JR East station was used by 3,347 passengers (alighting) daily.

Surrounding area
 Sano Post Office
 Sano City Hall
 Sano City Library

See also
 List of railway stations in Japan

References

External links

 JR East station information 
 Tobu station information 
	

Tobu Sano Line
Stations of Tobu Railway
Railway stations in Tochigi Prefecture
Railway stations in Japan opened in 1888
Ryōmō Line
Sano, Tochigi